Stuntmasterz were a British music group featuring Steve Harris, Rob Davis and Pete Cook. They are best known for their hit single "The Ladyboy Is Mine", a mash-up of the songs "The Boy Is Mine" by Brandy and Monica, and Modjo's "Lady (Hear Me Tonight)". The song peaked at number 10 on the UK Singles Chart in March 2001.

Discography

References

British musical trios
English dance music groups
English DJs